Kapil Seth (30 December 1979 – 2 July 2016) was an Indian cricketer. He played first-class cricket for Madhya Pradesh. He died on 2 July 2016 from Hepatitis B.

See also
 List of Madhya Pradesh cricketers

References

External links
 

1979 births
2016 deaths
Indian cricketers
Madhya Pradesh cricketers
People from Datia
Deaths from hepatitis